Chic Chic Chico is an album by American jazz drummer Chico Hamilton featuring performances recorded in 1965 for the Impulse! label.

The title song was included as a bonus track on the CD reissue of The Dealer.

Reception
The Allmusic review by Scott Yanow awarded it 4 stars and stated: "Not essential, but this album has its strong moments".

Track listing
All compositions by Gábor Szabó except as indicated
 "Chic Chic Chico" (Manny Albam) - 2:47
 "Corrida De Toros" - 5:35
 "Tarantula" - 3:03
 "What's New?" (Bob Haggart, Johnny Burke) - 6:02
 "St. Paddy's Day Parade" (Chico Hamilton) - 3:09
 "Carol's Walk" (Chico Hamilton) - 6:36
 "Swampy" - 2:45
 "Fire Works" - 5:52
Recorded in Hollywood, California, on January 4, 1965 (tracks 2-8) and March 16, 1965 (track 1)

Personnel
Chico Hamilton – drums
John Anderson - trumpet (tracks 2-8)
Lou Blackburn - trombone (tracks 2-8)
Henry Sigismonti - french horn (tracks 2-8)
Charles Lloyd – flute (track 1)
Bill Green - flute, piccolo (tracks 2-8)
Harold Land (tracks 2-8), Jimmy Woods (track 1) - tenor saxophone
Gábor Szabó – guitar
Albert Stinson – bass
Willie Bobo - percussion (track 1)

References 

Impulse! Records albums
Chico Hamilton albums
1965 albums
Albums produced by Bob Thiele